Perica Radić (born 13 March 1984 in Smederevo, SR Serbia, SFR Yugoslavia) is a Serbian football player, he plays the position of goalkeeper for the French team AS Cannes.

Career 
Radić played the position of goalkeeper for the French team FC Nantes Atlantique in 2000–2006 and later for AC Ajaccio and Stade de Reims.

External links
 

1984 births
Living people
Serbian footballers
FC Nantes players
AC Ajaccio players
Stade de Reims players
FC Gueugnon players
Ligue 2 players
Association football goalkeepers